Dolichancistrus setosus is a species of catfish in the family Loricariidae. It is a freshwater fish native to South America, where it occurs in the Andes of Colombia. The species reaches 12 cm (4.7 inches) in total length and inhabits high-altitude areas. FishBase notes that the river basin that the species is native to is currently unknown, presumably because it was not originally recorded when the species was described.

References 

Ancistrini
Fish described in 1887